Graphium hicetaon is a butterfly found in the Solomon Islands - Bougainville Island, Choiseul Island, Shortland Island, Florida Island, Guadalcanal, New Georgia Group and Ugi Island - that belongs to the swallowtail family.

Taxonomy
Graphium hicetaon belongs to the wallacei species group. This clade has four members:
Graphium wallacei (Hewitson, 1858)
Graphium hicetaon (Mathew, 1886)
Graphium browni (Godman & Salvin, 1879)
Graphium sandawanum Yamamoto, 1977

The holotype is in the Natural History Museum, London.

References

Tsukada, E. & Nishiyama, Y. 1982. Papilionidae. In: Tsukada, E. (ed): Butterflies of the South East Asian Islands. Volume 1. Plapac Co., Tokyo

External links
External images of holotype

hicetaon
Butterflies of Oceania
Endemic fauna of the Solomon Islands
Insects of the Solomon Islands
Lepidoptera of Papua New Guinea
Butterflies described in 1886